The Rotach is a  tributary of Lake Constance, which drains to the Rhine, in the German state of Baden-Württemberg. The river source is near the municipality of Wilhelmsdorf. It flows southward through Horgenzell and Oberteuringen before emptying into Lake Constance at the city of Friedrichshafen.

References

Rivers of Baden-Württemberg
Tributaries of Lake Constance
Rivers of Germany